The Yampi sandslider (Lerista praefrontalis)  is a species of skink found in Western Australia.

References

Lerista
Reptiles described in 1986
Taxa named by Allen Eddy Greer